The 1983 Benson and Hedges Open was a men's Grand Prix tennis tournament held in Auckland, New Zealand. It was the 16th edition of the APT Auckland Open tournament and was held from 10 January to 16 January 1983. First-seeded John Alexander won the singles title.

Finals

Singles

 John Alexander defeated  Russell Simpson 6–4, 6–3, 6–3
 It was Alexander's 1st title of the year and the 34th of his career.

Doubles

 Chris Lewis /  Russell Simpson defeated  David Graham /  Laurie Warder 7–6, 6–3
 It was Lewis's 1st title of the year and the 8th of his career. It was Simpson's only title of the year and the 6th of his career.

References

External links
 ATP – tournament profile
 ITF – tournament edition details

Heineken
ATP Auckland Open
1983 Grand Prix (tennis)
January 1983 sports events in New Zealand